Lamar is a census-designated place in Porter Township in southern Clinton County, Pennsylvania, United States. As of the 2010 census the population was 562.

The community is located along Pennsylvania Route 64 in southern Clinton County and is bordered on the west by Nittany in Walker Township, Centre County.

The community is named for Revolutionary War Major Marien Lamar, who was killed in the Battle of Paoli, as stated in the "History of Centre and Clinton Counties, Pennsylvania" by John Blair Linn. Major Lamar was born in Maryland.

Demographics

References

External links

Census-designated places in Clinton County, Pennsylvania
Census-designated places in Pennsylvania